Didem Erol or Serah Henesey  also known as Dana Flynn  is an Australian-born Turkish American actress, model, and TV host. She was born in Sydney to Turkish parents and lives in Los Angeles, California. Amidst media speculation, Erol confirmed she was dating Quentin Tarantino whom she met in Cannes, France. Erol's relationship with the American film director Tarantino ended after four years. She is also close friends with Oliver Stone. Holding multiple citizenships, Erol is fluent in English and Turkish.

Filmography

External links

References 

1975 births
Female models from California
American people of Turkish descent
American television actresses
American television hosts
Australian emigrants to the United States
Living people
Actresses from Sydney
American women television presenters
Australian women television presenters
Australian television presenters
Australian people of Turkish descent
21st-century American women